Athar Ali Khan was a Member of the 4th National Assembly of Pakistan as a representative of East Pakistan.

Career
Khan was a Member of the  4th National Assembly of Pakistan representing Bakerganj-cum-Khulna.

References

Pakistani MNAs 1965–1969
Living people
Year of birth missing (living people)
Place of birth missing (living people)